Azzaba is a district in Skikda Province, Algeria, on the Mediterranean Sea. It was named after its capital, Azzaba.

Municipalities
The district is further divided into 5 municipalities:
Azzaba
Aïn Cherchar
Es Sebt
Laghdir
Djendel Saâdi Mohammed

Districts of Skikda Province